Gertrude Fenton (1841 – April 11,1884), was an English novelist and magazine editor. She specialised in writing popular romantic fiction and published four novels between 1869 and 1871. Her most popular novel was her first Cora; or,The Romance of Three Years: A Novel.

Life
Annie Maria Gertrude Thomas, professionally known as Gertrude Fenton was born at Hampton Wick in Middlesex  in 1841.She was the daughter of a London based barrister William Lewis Thomas and his wife Ann Hellier. Her formative years were spent in Chelsea and in 1865 she married Arthur Fenton, the son of John Fenton, former MP for Rochdaleand brother of the pioneer war photographer Roger Fenton (1819-1869).The young couple are recorded in 1871 census as living near Aylsham in Norfolkand in the 1881 census in Freshwater on the Isle of Wight, Hampshire.

Whilst living on the Isle of Wight she and her husband published a literary periodical The Carisbrooke Magazine.Contributors included a mixture of less well known and established writers such as Theo Gift complemented by articles on famous personalities that included Henry Irving, the stage actor.The magazine ran from 1880 into 1881 by when Fenton was in poor health. Gertrude Fenton died on April 11 1884 of cerebrovascular and hepatic diseaseand was interred at Carisbrooke Cemetery.

Literary works

Gertrude Fenton wrote four romantic novels published between 1869 and 1871 and a novelette in 1873 beginning with Cora; or, The Romance of Three Years, her most successful novel and ending with Is Lady Clara Dead? They are examples of sensation fiction that flourished during the mid-Victorian era. Published by F.Enos Arnold of London as a single volume yellow-back Cora was marketed as entertaining reading and often sold at railway stations. It included a brightly coloured cover, printed by chromoxylography and was aimed at a predominately young female class of readers. It was reviewed by the St. James' Magazine and United Empire Review who thought the story far-fetched but entertaining.

Cora was successful enough for the publisher F. E. Arnold to publish three further novels in 1871. The Wicked Lady which is partly set in a mental institution was adapted for the stage by the playwright and actor, Brandon Ellis who toured with it in 1874 appearing at Theatre Royal in Huddersfield.Revenge another romance was printed with a maroon cover embossed with the motif,  St.James Series and was, at least in presentation, an attempt to distance Gertrude Fenton from the garish yellow-backs.The Spectator Literary Review provided a favourable review calling Revenge a 'thrilling romance'.

Bibliography

Cora; or, The Romance of Three Years: A Novel. 1 vol. F.Enos Arnold, London (1869)
A Wicked Woman: A Novel.  1 vol. F. Enos Arnold, London  (1871)
Revenge. 1 vol.  F. Enos Arnold , London (1871)
Is Lady Clara Dead?: A Novel. 3 vols. F.Enos Arnold, London (1871) 
Ruth’s Sacrifice: a Novelette in Six Chapters. St.James’ Magazine and United Empire Review, Holiday Annual (1873)

Notes

References

1841 births
1884 deaths
People from Hampshire
19th-century English novelists
Victorian novelists
Victorian women writers
English women novelists
19th-century English women writers